The Positive and Negative Syndrome Scale (PANSS) is a medical scale used for measuring symptom severity of patients with schizophrenia.  It was published in 1987 by Stanley Kay, Lewis Opler, and Abraham Fiszbein. It is widely used in the study of antipsychotic therapy. The scale is known as the "gold standard" that all assessments of psychotic behavioral disorders should follow.

The name refers to the two types of symptoms in schizophrenia, as defined by the American Psychiatric Association: positive symptoms, which refer to an excess or distortion of normal functions (e.g., hallucinations and delusions), and negative symptoms, which represent a diminution or loss of normal functions. Some of these functions which may be lost include normal thoughts, actions, ability to tell fantasies from reality, and the ability to properly express emotions.

The PANSS is a relatively brief interview, requiring 45 to 50 minutes to administer. The interviewer must be trained to a standardized level of reliability.

Interview items
To assess a patient using PANSS, an approximately 45-minute clinical interview is conducted. The patient is rated from 1 to 7 on 30 different symptoms based on the interview as well as reports of family members or primary care hospital workers.

Positive scale
7 Items, (minimum score = 7, maximum score = 49)
 Delusions
 Conceptual disorganization
 Hallucinations
 Excitement 
 Grandiosity
 Suspiciousness/persecution
 Hostility

Negative scale
7 Items, (minimum score = 7, maximum score = 49)
 Blunted affect
 Emotional withdrawal
 Poor rapport
 Passive/apathetic social withdrawal
 Difficulty in abstract thinking
 Lack of spontaneity and flow of conversation
 Stereotyped thinking

General Psychopathology scale
16 Items, (minimum score = 16, maximum score = 112)
 Somatic concern
 Anxiety
 Guilt feelings
 Tension	
 Mannerisms and posturing
 Depression
 Motor retardation
 Uncooperativeness
 Unusual thought content
 Disorientation
 Poor attention
 Lack of judgment and insight
 Disturbance of volition
 Poor impulse control
 Preoccupation			
 Active social avoidance

PANSS Total score minimum = 30, maximum = 210

Scoring 
As 1 rather than 0 is given as the lowest score for each item, a patient can not score lower than 30 for the total PANSS score. Scores are often given separately for the positive items, negative items, and general psychopathology. In their original publication on the PANSS scale, Stanley Kay and colleagues tested the scale on 101 adult patients (20-68 years-old) with schizophrenia and the mean scores were, 
 Positive scale = 18.20 
 Negative scale = 21.01
 General psychopathology = 37.74
Based on meta-analytic results, an alternative five-factor solution of the PANSS was proposed with positive symptoms, negative symptoms, disorganization, excitement, and emotional distress.

See also 
Brief Psychiatric Rating Scale (BPRS)
Diagnostic classification and rating scales used in psychiatry
Scale for the Assessment of Negative Symptoms (SANS)
Scale for the Assessment of Positive Symptoms (SAPS)

References

External links 
The positive and negative syndrome scale (PANSS) for schizophrenia.
The PANSS Institute
https://www.webmd.com/schizophrenia/mental-health-schizophrenia#1

Schizophrenia
Psychosis screening and assessment tools